Vladimir Golschmann (16 December 18931 March 1972) was a French-American conductor.

Biography

Vladimir Golschmann was born in Paris.  He studied violin at the Schola Cantorum in Paris.  He was a notable advocate of the music of the composers known as Les Six.  In Paris, he had his own concert series, the Concerts Golschmann, which began in 1919.  He became the director of music activities at the Sorbonne, at the behest of the French government.  Golschmann also conducted performances at the Ballets Russes of Sergei Diaghilev.

Golschmann was the music director of the Saint Louis Symphony Orchestra  (SLSO) from 1931 to 1958, their longest-serving music director.  His initial contract was for 3 years, and the successive contracts were renewed yearly.  For the last three years of his tenure, he was named conductor emeritus, during their search for a successor music director. He was initiated as an honorary member of the New Zeta chapter of Phi Mu Alpha Sinfonia music fraternity in 1949. Golschmann remained in the US, becoming a citizen in 1957.

In 1957 Golschmann joined forces with a young Glenn Gould and the Columbia Symphony Orchestra to record Ludwig van Beethoven's Piano Concerto No. 1 in C major, Op. 15 and Johann Sebastian Bach's Concerto No. 5 in F minor, BWV 1056 for Columbia Masterworks (ML 5298, 1958).

In his later years, Golschmann also worked with the orchestras of Tulsa and Denver.  He died in New York City.

Noted recordings 

 "Modern French Music", a circa 1950 Long playing record, Capitol Records, P8244.  On this recording he conducted the Concert Arts Orchestra.  The program was Honegger: Pastorale d'été; Milhaud: Le bœuf sur le toit; Satie: Three Gymnopédies; Ravel: Le tombeau de Couperin.
 Johann Sebastian Bach: Keyboard Concerti Nos 2-5, 7 with Glenn Gould / Columbia Symphony Orchestra
 Samuel Barber: Music for a Scene from Shelley, Second Essay with the Symphony of the Air
 Béla Bartók: Piano Concerto No. 3 with Leonard Pennario / SLSO
 Hector Berlioz: Symphonie fantastique with the Vienna State Opera Orchestra
 César Franck: Symphony in D minor with the SLSO
 Wolfgang Amadeus Mozart: Piano Concerto No. 23 with Arthur Rubinstein / SLSO
 Sergei Prokofiev: Piano Concerto No. 3 with Leonard Pennario / SLSO
 Sergei Rachmaninoff: Piano Concerto No. 2 with Leonard Pennario / SLSO
 Arnold Schoenberg: Verklärte Nacht, with the SLSO recorded 1945
 Dmitri Shostakovich: Symphony No. 5 with the SLSO
 Pyotr Ilyich Tchaikovsky: Romeo and Juliet fantasy-overture,  Francesca da Rimini with the SLSO
 Roy Harris: Folksong Symphony with the American Festival Chorus and Orchestra

References
 Jaeger, Stefan. Das Atlantisbuch der Dirigenten, Atlantis Musikbuch-Verlag, 1985.
 Lyman, Darryl. Great Jews in Music, J. D. Publishers, 1986.
 Myers, Kurtz. Index to record reviews 1984–1987, G.K. Hall, 1989.
 Pâris, Alain. Dictionnaire des interpretes et de l'interpretation musicale au XX siecle, Robert Laffont, 1989.
 Sadie, Stanley. The new Grove dictionary of music and musicians'', Macmillan, 1980.

External links

 Vladimir Golschmann biography at the Saint Louis Symphony Orchestra website
 1948 magazine advertisement with picture of Vladimir Golschmann
 A site in French about Vladimir Golschmann

1893 births
1972 deaths
French conductors (music)
French male conductors (music)
American male conductors (music)
19th-century French Jews
French emigrants to the United States
American people of French-Jewish descent
Jewish American classical musicians
Musicians from Paris
Schola Cantorum de Paris alumni
20th-century American conductors (music)
20th-century French musicians
20th-century American male musicians
20th-century American Jews